Boone Township is one of twelve townships in Dubois County, Indiana. As of the 2010 census, its population was 799 and it contained 321 housing units.

History
The Lemmon's Presbyterian Church was listed on the National Register of Historic Places in 1992.

Geography

Unincorporated towns
 Portersville

Adjacent townships
 Reeve Township, Daviess County (north)
 Harbison Township (east)
 Bainbridge Township (southeast)
 Madison Township (south)
 Jefferson Township, Pike County (west)
 Harrison Township, Daviess County (northwest)

Major highways
  Indiana State Road 56

Cemeteries
The township contains two cemeteries: Bethel and Sherritt.

References
 
 United States Census Bureau cartographic boundary files

External links
 Indiana Township Association
 United Township Association of Indiana

Townships in Dubois County, Indiana
Jasper, Indiana micropolitan area
Townships in Indiana